The 44th Academy Awards were presented April 10, 1972, at the Dorothy Chandler Pavilion in Los Angeles.  The ceremonies were presided over by Helen Hayes, Alan King, Sammy Davis Jr., and Jack Lemmon. One of the highlights of the evening was the appearance of Betty Grable who made one of her last public appearances. She appeared along with one of her leading men from the 1940s, singer Dick Haymes, to present the musical scoring awards. Grable died the following year. This was the first time in the history of the Awards in which the nominees were shown on superimposed pictures while being announced.

Winners and nominees

Awards 
Nominations announced on February 22, 1972. Winners are listed first, highlighted in boldface and indicated with a double dagger.

Honorary Academy Awards 

Charlie Chaplin received an honorary award at this ceremony, for "the incalculable effect he has had in making motion pictures the art form of this century".  Chaplin, who had been living in self-imposed exile in Switzerland for twenty years, came back to the United States to re-market his older films and to receive this award. When introduced to the audience, Chaplin received a twelve-minute standing ovation, the longest in Academy Awards history.

Films with multiple wins and nominations

Presenters and performers

Presenters (in order of appearance)

Performers (in order of appearance)

See also
 29th Golden Globe Awards
 1971 in film
 14th Grammy Awards
 23rd Primetime Emmy Awards
 24th Primetime Emmy Awards
 25th British Academy Film Awards
 26th Tony Awards

References

Academy Awards ceremonies
1971 film awards
1972 in Los Angeles
1972 in American cinema
April 1972 events in the United States
Television shows directed by Marty Pasetta